The 1934 Macdonald Brier, the Canadian men's national curling championship, was held from March 6 to 8, 1934 at the Granite Club in Toronto, Ontario.

Team Manitoba who was skipped by Leo Johnson finished round robin play undefeated with a 7-0 record to take Manitoba's sixth Brier Tankard. Manitoba won the event in their last game, when they defeated Ontario in front of 2,000 fans. Tied in the last end, Johnson made a "dramatic last rock draw" to win the game.

Ontario's 26-2 victory over Nova Scotia in Draw 1 set Brier records at the time for the most points scored in a game by one team (26) and for the largest margin of victory (24).

Teams
The teams are listed as follows:

Round Robin standings

Round Robin results

Draw 1

Draw 2

Draw 3

Draw 4

Draw 5

Draw 6

Draw 7

References 

Macdonald Brier, 1934
Macdonald Brier, 1934
The Brier
Curling in Toronto
Macdonald Brier
Macdonald Brier
1930s in Toronto